Mithat Şükrü Bleda (1874 – 19 February 1956) was a Turkish politician, who was a founding member of the Committee of Union and Progress (CUP), which he also served as its party secretary.

Biography 
Midhat Şükrü was born in Selanik (Thesalonika). After graduating from the civil service academy, he took part in the founding of the Committee of Union and Progress. He served as its general secretary between 1911- 1917. He was also a deputy in the Ottoman parliament, representing Serres, Drama, and Burdur in 1908, 1912, and 1914 respectively. Between 1935 - 1950 he represented Sivas in the Grand National Assembly. He died in Istanbul in 1956, and was buried in the Monument of Liberty upon his will.

His memoirs were published under the title of Bir İmparatorluğun Çöküşü (The Collapse of an Empire), which constitute an important source of the Second Constitutional Era. It was adapted into modern Turkish by his son Turgut Bleda (1979).

References

External Links 
https://web.archive.org/web/20160206090417/https://www.tbmm.gov.tr/TBMM_Album/Cilt1/Cilt1.pdf

1874 births
1956 deaths
People from Thessaloniki
Politicians from Thessaloniki
20th-century Turkish politicians
Committee of Union and Progress politicians
Politicians from the Ottoman Empire